Equiniti Group is a British-based outsourcing business focused on financial and administration services.

History
The business has its origins in the share registration business of Lloyds TSB which was bought out from Lloyds by Advent International, a private equity institution, in 2007. The company was the subject of an initial public offering in October 2015. In July 2017 it announced the acquisition of the share registration business of Wells Fargo.

On 30 July 2020, the company announced its intention to rebrand as "EQ". In April 2021 Siris Capital made an offer worth £661 million for the company. The transaction was completed on 10 December 2021.

Operations
The company's services include share registration arrangements for listed companies, outsourcing of complaints management and administration and payment services for pension schemes.

Equiniti India
Equiniti India, Equiniti's Indian offshore arm, opened in Chennai in 2014.  An additional branch office opened in Bengaluru in 2019.

References

Companies based in West Sussex
Financial services companies established in 2007
Companies listed on the London Stock Exchange
2021 mergers and acquisitions